South Gate is the 19th largest city in Los Angeles County, California, United States, with . It is part of the Gateway Cities region of southeastern Los Angeles County.

The city was incorporated on January 20, 1923, and it became known as the "Azalea City" when it adopted the flower as its symbol in 1965. As of the 2020 census, the city had a population of 92,726.

In 1990, South Gate was one of ten U.S. communities to receive the All-America City Award from the National Civic League.

History

Native Americans

South Gate was in the traditional cultural territory of the Gabrielino. Gabrielino villages or archaeological sites are rumored to have existed at the South Gate Park and at the old City Hall site at the intersection of Post Street and Victoria Avenue. The village of Tajauta was located on the border of South Gate, Lynwood, and Watts.

Land grants

Among the early Spanish settlers was one of California's first families, the Lugos. The Lugo land grant encompassed a great part of what is now the City of South Gate.

While Francisco Lugo was stationed at Mission San Antonio de Padua near Salinas, California, his first California son, Antonio Maria Lugo was born in 1775. In 1810, the King of Spain formally granted the land to Lugo as a reward for his and his father's military service. Rancho San Antonio extended from the low range of hills which separated it from the San Gabriel Valley to the old Dominguez Ranch at its south, and from the eastern boundary of the pueblo of Los Angeles to the San Gabriel River. Around a century later, the area around the southern gate of the ranch became the City of South Gate.

Development
By 1880, cattle raising had been replaced by agriculture as the most important local industry. During the years between 1910 and 1940, most of the agricultural land was replaced by homes and factories. Early developers accelerated the suburbanization of what was then called South Gate Gardens by subdividing the land into small plots and selling the empty plots to blue-collar workers. A majority of early homes were built individually as plot owners used "sweat equity rather than cash to construct their own homes" and the local economy relied heavily on urban agriculture.

Tweedy family
R.D. Tweedy was born in 1812 in Illinois and came to California by ox-drawn cart in 1852. The family was large, and several generations have lived in this city. The downtown business district is known as the Tweedy Mile.

Naming
The city was named in 1918 after the South Gate Gardens on the Cudahy Ranch. The city was incorporated five years later, in 1923, using the shortened form of the name. The name refers to the city's being south of Los Angeles.

Geography
The total area is 1.59% water.

The Los Angeles River runs through the eastern part of South Gate.

South Gate has a semi-arid Mediterranean climate with mild winters and hot, dry summers.

Demographics

2010
The 2010 United States Census reported that South Gate had a population of 94,396. The racial makeup of South Gate was 47,645 (50.5%) White, 3,209 (3.4%) Non-Hispanic White, 890 (0.9%) African American, 878 (0.9%) Native American, 732 (0.8%) Asian, 99 (0.1%) Pacific Islander, 40,624 (43.0%) from other races, and 3,528 (3.7%) from two or more races. Hispanic or Latino of any race were 89,442 persons (94.8%).

The Census reported that 94,308 people (99.9% of the population) lived in households, 16 (0%) lived in non-institutionalized group quarters, and 72 (0.1%) were institutionalized.

There were 23,278 households, out of which 13,805 (59.3%) had children under the age of 18 living in them, 13,183 (56.6%) were opposite-sex married couples living together, 4,706 (20.2%) had a female householder with no husband present, 2,261 (9.7%) had a male householder with no wife present.  There were 1,879 (8.1%) unmarried opposite-sex partnerships, and 134 (0.6%) same-sex married couples or partnerships. 2,292 households (9.8%) were made up of individuals, and 996 (4.3%) had someone living alone who was 65 years of age or older. The average household size was 4.05. There were 20,150 families (86.6% of all households); the average family size was 4.24.

The population was spread out, with 29,374 people (31.1%) under the age of 18, 11,298 people (12.0%) aged 18 to 24, 28,039 people (29.7%) aged 25 to 44, 19,062 people (20.2%) aged 45 to 64, and 6,623 people (7.0%) who were 65 years of age or older. The median age was 29.4 years. For every 100 females, there were 96.4 males. For every 100 females age 18 and over, there were 93.9 males.

The homeowner vacancy rate was 1.5%; the rental vacancy rate was 3.6%. 46,665 people (49.4% of the population) lived in owner-occupied housing units and 47,643 people (50.5%) lived in rental housing units.

During 2015–2019, South Gate had a median household income of $52,321, with 17.2% of the population living below the federal poverty line. For people ages 25 and over, 56.7% had a high school degree or higher while 9.4% had a bachelor's degree or higher.

2000
As of the 2000 census, there were 96,375 people, 23,213 households, and  20,063 families residing in the city.

The racial makeup of the city was 41.6% White (0.78% White Non-Hispanic), 1.2% Black or African-American, 0.9% American Indian and Alaska Native, 0.8% Asian and 51% some other race (mostly Mestizo). 92% of the population were Hispanic or Latino of any race.

There were 23,213 households, out of which 58.2% had children under the age of 18 living with them, 59.6% were married couples living together, 18.4% had a female householder with no husband present, and 13.6% were non-families. 10.4% of all households were made up of individuals, and 4.8% had someone living alone who was 65 years of age or older. The average household size was 4.15 and the average family size was 4.37.  In the city, the population was spread out, with 35.6% under the age of 18, 12.5% from 18 to 24, 31.6% from 25 to 44, 14.9% from 45 to 64, and 5.4% who were 65 years of age or older. The median age was 26 years. For every 100 females, there were 98.3 males. For every 100 females age 18 and over, there were 95.5 males.

The median income for a household in the city was $35,695, and the median income for a family was $35,789. Males had a median income of $25,350 versus $19,978 for females. The per capita income for the city was $10,602. 19.2% of the population and 17.4% of families were below the poverty line. Out of the total population, 24.2% of those under the age of 18 and 12.0% of those 65 and older were living below the poverty line.

Religion

There are approximately 40 churches located in the City representing a variety of religious denominations.
53.4% of the people in South Gate, CA are religious. 37.0% are Catholic; 6.7% are Protestant; 1.6% are members of the Church of Jesus Christ of Latter-day Saints; 5.2% are another Christian faith; 1.1% are Jewish; 1.1% are "an eastern faith"; 0.7% are Muslim.

Demographics history
South Gate developed during the 1920s and 1930s as an industrial city (primarily in "metal-bashing" industries) and its blue-collar community was predominantly non-Hispanic white.

During the 1940s and 1950s, South Gate was one of the most fiercely segregationist cities in Southern California.  Gangs of white youths were known to prowl the streets looking for blacks who dared to cross over from neighboring Watts. One of the most infamous clubs of the area at that time was the "Spook Hunters".

Since the 1970s, South Gate has had a large Hispanic community, which became dominant in the 1990s as working-class Hispanics and immigrant Latin American families filled the vacuum left by non-Hispanic whites leaving for more space in the outer suburbs.

Mexican and Salvadoran are the common ancestries in South Gate.

Economy
South Gate was the location of a General Motors automobile manufacturing facility called South Gate Assembly which was built in 1936. Originally built to manufacture Buick, Oldsmobile, and Pontiac vehicles, it was converted to war production after 1940, and was the primary supplier of aircraft engines for the B-24 Liberator, Douglas C-47 Skytrain, and the Douglas C-54 Skymaster, as the Douglas and Consolidated companies has aircraft manufacturing facilities in Long Beach and San Diego. During the 1950s, it was GM's highest producing facility. The plant was closed in 1982 and is now the location of South East High School as of 2005.

As of June 2009, California's EDD lists the unemployment rate in South Gate as 14.4%, with negative job growth. The California State Board of Equalization lists South Gate's sale tax rate as 10.75%. The income per capita is $11,566, which includes all adults and children. The median household income is $41,064.

South Gate's commercial activity is concentrated in the following zones:
Tweedy Mile (on Tweedy Boulevard from Alameda Street to Atlantic Avenue)
Firestone Boulevard (from Alameda Street to Garfield Avenue)
El Paseo (Corner of Firestone Boulevard and Garfield Avenue)
Hollydale (on Garfield Avenue from I-105 to Imperial Highway)

As of April 1, 2009, the City of South Gate imposed a 10.25-percent sales tax (statewide plus local supplementary, which is now 9.75% with the expiration of the temporary tax increase under Proposition 1A), which matches Pico Rivera's sales tax rate as the highest in the State of California.

On July 9, 2009, the South Gate City Council held a special meeting where a resolution was adopted declaring a fiscal emergency for the City of South Gate.

Government

South Gate is represented in the California State Senate by Democrat Lena Gonzalez (33rd District), and in the California State Assembly by Democrat Anthony Rendon (63rd District).

Local government

The City Council consists of five persons elected at large by the residents of South Gate. These Council members serve a four-year term and establish the governing policies and procedures for the city. The Mayor is selected on an annual, rotating basis from among the Council Members. The current City Council consists of:

Mayor Al Rios (2017–present).
Vice Mayor Maria Del Pilar Avalos (2020–present).
Councilmember Maria R. Davila (2003–present).
Councilmember Denise Diaz (2017–present).
Councilmember Gil Hurtado (2005-2017, 2020–present).

City Clerk
Yodit Glaze

The City Clerk in South Gate is an elected position that serves a four-year term. As the official record keeper for the city, the City Clerk is responsible for maintaining all central and legal files, preparing City Council meeting agendas and minutes, conducting municipal elections and assisting the Los Angeles Registrar-Recorder with voter registration.

City Treasurer
Jose De La Paz

De La Paz was elected City Treasurer of South Gate on November, 2022.

City Manager
Michael Flad

Michael Flad was appointed City Manager by the City Council on December 3, 2012. The City Manager is appointed by the City Council to carry out its policies and ensure that the community is served in a responsive manner. Responsible for oversight of all City operations and the delivery of public services, the City Manager works closely with the city's departments in developing policy recommendations and responding to directives of the City Council.

Political parties
63.10% of the people in South Gate are registered as Democrats, with 35.60% registered as Republican. The remaining 1.30% are independent.

Scandal and corruption
From 2001 to 2003, then-city treasurer Albert Robles, along with three accomplices on the city council, accepted bribes and in turn gave taxpayer dollars to friends and relatives to perform city contracts. The three accomplices formed a majority of the five-member city council, so they could effectively run the city any way they wanted. For example, in 2002, Robles was arrested on felony threat charges but was appointed by the city council to the deputy city manager position and had his legal bills covered by the city. The city council gave themselves a 2000% pay raise, and cut the pay of city clerk Carmen Avalos by 90%, after she complained about corruption and election fraud in the city to the California Secretary of State.

On January 28, 2003, voters recalled Robles along with his political allies, former Mayor Xochitl Ruvalcaba, former Vice Mayor Raul Moriel, and former city councilwoman Maria Benavides.

Robles was convicted of bribery in July 2005. In November 2006 he was sentenced to 10 years in federal prison, ordered to pay the city of South Gate $639,000 in restitution, and was immediately put into custody.

In March 2006, Rudy Navarro, who was elected to replace Albert Robles as city treasurer, was caught making a false statement on his biography as posted on the city's official web site. He claimed that he earned a degree from San Diego State University, when he actually had not completed all the requirements.

South Gate's recent political history has been characterized by political observers and editors as having elements of "Third World politics".

Finances
South Gate currently is one of the lowest in taxing its residents in the south east area of Los Angeles. It is one of the few cities that does NOT have a Utility Users Tax (UUT). Most cities have an additional tax added to the sales tax for utilities such as gas, water, electricity, phone, cell phone, cable, and internet. Most cities range from +/- 4%-11%. South Gate is 0%.

County representation
In the Los Angeles County Board of Supervisors, South Gate is in the Fourth District, represented by Janice Hahn.

The Los Angeles County Department of Health Services operates the Whittier Health Center in Whittier, serving South Gate.

Infrastructure

Roads
Interstate 710
Imperial Highway

Buses
South Gate is served by Metro Local and Metro Rapid buses. The City of South Gate operates the Get Around Town Express (GATE) to provide local service.

City parks
South Gate offers nine city parks for the enjoyment of its citizens.
This park is used to carry out most of the Parks and Recreation Department's community programs. There are a total of six different facilities at this park, some of which can be rented out for a variety of events. These facilities include the Municipal Auditorium, Girls Club House, 9-hole Par 3 Golf Course, Senior Recreation Center, Swim Stadium, and Sports Center. The site also features athletic fields, outdoor basketball courts, two playgrounds, tennis courts, a skate park, several shaded areas for picnics, and a Jr. Hockey Rink. The park closes at 10:00 pm.
The park closes at sunset.
No reservation is needed for picnics. The park closes at sunset.
It has a small playground, a ball field and a grass area. The park closes at sunset.
The park closes at 10:00pm.
The park closes at sunset.
It has a playground and a small grass area. The park closes at sunset.
The park closes at sunset.
It has a playground and a small grass area. The park closes at sunset.

Education

Schools located in South Gate include: 21 public (13 elementary, 3 high school, 3 charter schools and 2 middle school and 1 span school and 1 continuation high school) and two parochial schools. Adult Education classes are conducted at both the junior and senior high schools. The city is also served by 3 community colleges (Compton, Cerritos and East Los Angeles—main campus and South Gate satellite) and 3 California State Universities (Dominguez Hills, Long Beach and Los Angeles.)

Public schools

Most of South Gate is served by the Los Angeles Unified School District public school system. A small section of South Gate is served by the Paramount Unified School District and Downey Unified School District.

Los Angeles Unified School District

LAUSD primary schools
Bryson Avenue Elementary School (opened 1931, partially a Math, Science, Technology magnet school)
Independence Elementary School (opened 1997)
Liberty Boulevard Elementary School (opened 1932)
Madison Elementary School  (opened 2005)
Montara Avenue Elementary School (opened 1988)
San Gabriel Avenue Elementary School (opened 1920)
San Miguel Avenue Elementary School (opened 1989, partially a math and science magnet school)
Stanford Avenue Elementary School (1-5, opened 1924)
Stanford New Primary Center (K, opened 2004)
State Street Elementary School (opened 1932)
Tweedy Elementary School (Originally Opened 1931)  (opened 1950)
Victoria Avenue Elementary School (opened 1925)
Willow Avenue Elementary School (opened 2012)

LAUSD charter schools
Firestone (opened 2010)
Aspire Gateway (opened 2010)
Valiente College Preparatory Charter School ( 2015)
KIPP Corazon (2017)

LAUSD middle schools
International Studies Learning Center 
South Gate Middle School (opened 1941)
South East Middle School (opened 2004)

LAUSD high schools

South Gate High School (opened 1932)
South East High School (opened 2005)
Legacy High School Complex
When South East High School opened, within the City of South Gate, the school's attendance boundary took land formerly zoned to South Gate High School, Huntington Park High School, and David Starr Jordan High School.

LAUSD span school

International Studies Learning Center (opened in 2004)

LAUSD  continuation high school

 Odyssey Continuation High School

Paramount Unified School District
Hollydale School (K-8)
Paramount High School

Part of South Gate is served by Downey Unified School District.

Private schools

Private primary schools
Lollypop Lane Preschool and Kindergarten
Redeemer Lutheran School
Saint Helen Elementary School

Private high schools
Academia Betel

Colleges and universities

South Gate Satellite Campus, East Los Angeles College

Public libraries
County of Los Angeles Public Library operates:
 Leland R. Weaver Library (4035 Tweedy Boulevard )
 Hollydale Library (12000 South Garfield Avenue )

Notable people

 Arleen Auger, opera singer; born in South Gate
 Don Bandy, pro football player
 Hal Bernson, Los Angeles City Council member, 1979–2003
 Don Buchla, inventor of Buchla music synthesizer
 Cypress Hill, Hip Hop/Rap Group 
 Mark Gonzales, pro skateboarder
 Lee Greenwood, country music recording artist; born in South Gate
 Doug Griffin, Major League Baseball player
 Doug Harvey, Hall of Fame baseball umpire
 Victor Henry, UFC Fighter
 Don Horn, pro football player
 Dave Huppert, Major League Baseball player and coach
 Lou Kimzey, publisher and movie producer
 Bob Klein, tight end for NFL's Los Angeles Rams
 Mellow Man Ace, rapper
 Dick Nen, Major League Baseball player
 Walter Perez, actor
 Dick Rand, Major League Baseball player
 Lorenzo Romar - NBA player, college basketball coach
 Pete Rozelle, Commissioner of National Football League, 1960-1989
 Glenn Seaborg, Nobel Prize winner
 Niki Sullivan, an original member of Buddy Holly's Crickets.

See also

 Albert Robles
 Seaborg Home
 South Gate High School
 South East High School
 List of Mexican-American communities

References

External links

 
California Enterprise Zones
Cities in Los Angeles County, California
Gateway Cities
Incorporated cities and towns in California
Populated places established in 1923
Chicano and Mexican neighborhoods in California